The Xié River is a river of Amazonas state in north-western Brazil. It is a right tributary of the Rio Negro.

The river flows through the  Alto Rio Negro Indigenous Territory, created in 1998.
The majority of the population of the Xié River are Baré and Werekena people.

See also
List of rivers of Amazonas

References

Brazilian Ministry of Transport

Rivers of Amazonas (Brazilian state)
Tributaries of the Rio Negro (Amazon)